Naturalistic pantheism, also known as scientific pantheism, is a form of pantheism. It has been used in various ways such as to relate God or divinity with concrete things, determinism, or the substance of the universe. God, from these perspectives, is seen as the aggregate of all unified natural phenomena. The phrase has often been associated with the philosophy of Baruch Spinoza, although academics differ on how it is used.

Component definitions
The term “pantheism" is derived from Greek words pan (Greek: πᾶν) meaning "all" and theos (θεός) meaning God. It was coined by Joseph Raphson in his work De spatio reali, published in 1697. The term was introduced to English by Irish writer John Toland in his 1705 work Socinianism Truly Stated, by a pantheist that described pantheism as the "opinion of those who believe in no other eternal being but the universe."

The term "naturalistic" derives from the word "naturalism", which has several meanings in philosophy and aesthetics. In philosophy the term frequently denotes the view that everything belongs to the world of nature and can be studied with the methods appropriate for studying that world, i.e. the sciences. It generally implies an absence of belief in supernatural beings.

Early conceptions
Joseph Needham, a modern British scholar of Chinese philosophy and science, has identified Taoism as "a naturalistic pantheism which emphasizes the unity and spontaneity of the operations of Nature." This philosophy can be dated to the late 4th century BCE.

The Hellenistic Greek philosophical school of Stoicism (which started in the early 3rd century BCE) rejected the dualist idea of the separate ideal/conscious and material realms, and identified the substance of God with the entire cosmos and heaven. However, not all philosophers who did so can be classified as naturalistic pantheists.

Modern conceptions
Naturalistic pantheism was expressed by various thinkers, including Giordano Bruno, who was burned at the stake for his views. However, the 17th century Dutch philosopher Spinoza became particularly known for it.

Baruch Spinoza

Possibly drawing upon the ideas of Descartes,
Baruch Spinoza connected God and Nature through the phrase deus sive natura ("God, or Nature"), making him the father of classical pantheism. He relied upon rationalism rather than the more intuitive approach of some Eastern traditions.

Spinoza's philosophy, sometimes known as Spinozism, has been understood in a number of ways, and caused disagreements such as the Pantheism controversy. However, many scholars have considered it to be a form of naturalistic pantheism. This has included viewing the pantheistic unity as natural. 
Others focus on the deterministic aspect of naturalism.
Spinoza inspired a number of other pantheists, with varying degrees of idealism towards nature. However, Spinoza's influence in his own time was limited.

Scholars have considered Spinoza the founder of a line of naturalistic pantheism, though not necessarily the only one.

Others
In 1705 the Irish writer John Toland endorsed a form of pantheism in which the God-soul is identical with the material universe.

German naturalist Ernst Haeckel (1834–1919) proposed a monistic pantheism in which the idea of God is identical with that of nature or substance.

The World Pantheist Movement, started in 1999, describes Naturalistic Pantheism as including reverence for the universe, realism, strong naturalism, and respect for reason and the scientific method as methods of understanding the world. Paul Harrison considers its position the closest modern equivalent to Toland's.

See also

References

Pantheism
Monism
Philosophical realism
Naturalism (philosophy)
Spinozism
Philosophy and thought in the Dutch Republic
Philosophy of religion